Governor Atkinson may refer to:

George W. Atkinson (1845–1925), 10th Governor of West Virginia
William Yates Atkinson (1854–1899), 55th Governor of Georgia